Henwood is a surname. Notable people with the surname include:

Berryman Henwood (1881–1955), justice of the Supreme Court of Missouri
Casey Henwood (born 1980), New Zealand field hockey player
Craig Henwood (born 1978), Australian sport shooter
Dai Henwood (born 1978), New Zealand comedian
Doug Henwood (born 1952), American journalist
Megan Henwood (born 1987), English singer-songwriter
Simon Henwood (born 1965), English artist and writer
Wayne Henwood (born 1962), Australian rules footballer
William Jory Henwood (1805–1875), British geologist

See also 

 Henwood, a British village
 Haywood (surname)
 Heawood
 Harwood (name)

Surnames
English-language surnames
Surnames of English origin
Surnames of British Isles origin